Acromantis palauana, common name Palau acromantis, is a species of praying mantis native to Palau.

See also
List of mantis genera and species

References

Palau
Mantodea of Oceania
Endemic fauna of Palau
Insects described in 1972